Nyombi Morris (born March 28, 1998) is a Ugandan environmental activist who is known for promoting and advocating for climate justice and gender equality. Morris's activism began when he asked world leaders and polluters to adopt climate change based on the devastating rains and floods in Uganda. Morris initially gained notice for his youth and his ability to speak out. He is CEO of a non-profit organization he founded known as Earth Volunteers, ambassador for the UNOCHA, and CNN's "Environmentalist of Tomorrow."

Early life

Morris grew up in Kampala, Uganda with his mother and a sister and a brother. His father left home when he was six years old. They moved to an area called Luzira, a suburb of Kampala to be near his grandmother's home.

Morris studied for a diploma in IT and Computer Science at Muteesa I Royal University in Masaka, Uganda. He received a scholarship but it wasn't enough to pay for all his fees.

Activism
In November 2014, while living in Luzira, rain and floods caused by deforestation of the Bugoma Forest, destroyed his family's farm and forced them to find a new home in Kampala. This experience began his activism that caused Morris to ask world leaders and polluters to take climate change more seriously.

A few years later, Morris was inspired by Vanessa Nakate, a Ugandan climate justice activist. That was the first time he learned about climate activism. Since then, he has joined her on school strikes.
 
In 2019, he became a social media manager and climate justice advocate for a non-profit called Rise Up Movement, that provides support for youth around the world to join forces and slow climate change. In September 2019, Morris's climate activism received international attention when he was featured striking for climate change in various news outlets, including BBC, CBC, CNN, The Verge, Global Citizens, Reuters, and Earth.org. For example, in June 2021, CNN voted Morris "Environmentalist of Tomorrow," for his environmental causes.

On September 12, 2020, Morris joined other activists challenging the National Forestry Authority on the sale of the Bugoma Forest, a protected tropical forest in western Uganda. He gave a television appearance about the Bugoma Forest and put pressure on the National Environment Management Authority of Uganda (NEMA). After the protest, 5 Twitter accounts were suspended at the request of the Uganda Government, including his.

Strike for Climate

On March 25, 2021, Morris joined the School Strike for Climate global movement, started by Swedish environmental activist Greta Thunberg, called Fridays for Future. Student strikes were on Friday. He and his brother were arrested on the streets of Kampala by the Uganda National Police when they were protesting for climate justice. When other people started gathering, they were released but took their placards and phones.

On October 31, 2021, Morris spoke to CBC chief political correspondent, Rosemary Barton, about the impact of climate change on his country. His message for world leaders at United Nations Climate Change Conference (COP26) was “To put an end to fossil fuels and make polluters pay.” The conference meets every year and is the global decision-making body set up to implement the United Nations Framework Convention on Climate Change.

In November 2021, Morris organized tree planning events and began foresting Uganda with seeds and native plants from community gardens. In a project called "Taking Climate Change to Schools," he worked with thirty schools to teach children to speak out on climate change and to understand what they can do about helping the environment. The project included a climate syllabus in schools, planting over 47,500 trees, and recycling plastic waste.

Morris won the Population Matters Choice Ambassador Award in January 2022, for helping to raise awareness of population issues. In July of that year, he got the Earth Champion Award for inspiring the younger generation to take action on climate change.

On the Call To Earth Day, in February 2022, Morris and a group of 30 volunteers planted over 500 trees in Jinja, Uganda. That same year, Morris earned the honor of ambassador from media organization Doha Debates at the SolvingIt26 project for making a positive difference for African nations. In February 2023, he was nominated as a Social Justice Hero, by Global Citizens, because "he displays the bravery needed to fight for an end climate change."

Awards

Morris has received honors and awards for his contributions towards environmental conservation and sustainable development.

 Environmentalist of Tomorrow Award, June 2021, from CNN for his environmental causes
 Doha Debates Ambassador Award, October 2021, from Doha Debates for making positive difference for African nations
 Population Matters Choice Ambassador Award, January 2022, for his leadership to raise awareness of population issues
 Earth Champion Award, July 2022, for helping children to take action on climate change
  Global Citizens' Social Justice Heroes Award, February 2023, nominated as climate activist

See also 
Greta Thunberg
Vanessa Nakate
Hilda Flavia Nakabuye
Immaculate Akello
Environmentalist
List of climate activists

References

External links 
 
 Climate Activist Nyombi Morris
 
 
 

1998 births
Living people
Climate activists
Ugandan environmentalists
People from Kampala District
Youth climate activists